"Phone Down" is a song by British rapper Stefflon Don and American rapper Lil Baby. Following its premiere as BBC Radio 1 DJ Annie Mac's Hottest Record in the World on June 19, 2019, the song was released as a single through 54 London, peaking at number 68 on the UK chart. The song was written by the artists and Fred, who produced the song with Sam Tsang.

Track listing

Charts

References

2019 singles
2019 songs
Stefflon Don songs
Lil Baby songs
Songs written by Stefflon Don
Songs written by Lil Baby
Songs written by Fred Again

Song recordings produced by Fred Again